As a subfield of public economics, fiscal federalism is concerned with "understanding which functions and instruments are best centralized and which are best placed in the sphere of decentralized levels of government" (Oates, 1999). In other words, it is the study of how competencies (expenditure side) and fiscal instruments (revenue side) are allocated across different (vertical) layers of the administration. An important part of its subject matter is the system of transfer payments or grants by which a central government shares its revenues with lower levels of government.

Federal governments use this power to enforce national rules and standards. There are two primary types of transfers, conditional and unconditional. A conditional transfer from a federal body to a province, or other territory, involves a certain set of conditions. If the lower level of government is to receive this type of transfer, it must agree to the spending instructions of the federal government. An example of this would be the Canada Health Transfer.

An unconditional grant is usually a cash or tax point transfer, with no spending instructions. An example of this would be a federal equalization transfer.

This may be noted that the concept of fiscal federalism is relevant for every type of government: unitary, federal and confederal. Sharma and Valdesalici (2020)  assert that the concept of fiscal federalism is not to be associated with fiscal decentralization in officially declared federations only; it is applicable even to non-federal states (having no formal federal constitutional arrangement) in the sense that they encompass different levels of government (multilevel governance) which have de facto decision-making authority.

This, however, does not mean that all forms of governments are 'fiscally' federal, only that 'fiscal federalism' is a set of principles that can be applied to all countries attempting 'fiscal decentralization'. In fact, fiscal federalism is a general normative framework for assignment of functions to the different levels of government and appropriate fiscal instruments for carrying out these functions 

In 2017, Governor of Rivers State of Nigeria, Ezenwo Nyesom Wike said that he believes true fiscal federalism will "strengthen the economy of his country as all sections will develop based on their comparative advantages". These questions arise: (a) how are federal and non-federal countries different with respect to 'fiscal federalism' or 'fiscal decentralization', and (b) how are fiscal federalism and fiscal decentralization related (similar or different)?

Chanchal Kumar Sharma  clarifies that while "fiscal federalism constitutes a set of guiding principles, a guiding concept" that helps in designing financial relations between the national and subnational levels of the government, "fiscal decentralization on the other hand is a process of applying such principles".

Federal and non-federal countries differ in the manner in which such principles are applied. Application differs because unitary and federal governments differ in their political and legislative context and thus provide different opportunities for fiscal decentralization.

New generation of scholars of federalism and fiscal federalism point out that over time the theory of fiscal federalism has evolved considerably. The goal of modern fiscal federalism is not just to ensure the efficient allocation of resources, but also to protect liberty and restrain the power of government, to share legislative and fiscal competencies, to foster political participation and preserve markets.

Main concepts 

The concepts of fiscal federalism are related to vertical and horizontal fiscal relations. The notions related to horizontal fiscal relations are related to regional imbalances and horizontal competition. Similarly the notions related to fiscal relations are related to vertical fiscal imbalance between the two senior levels of government, that is the centre and the states/provinces. While the concept of horizontal fiscal imbalance is relatively non controversial (as explained above), the concept of vertical fiscal imbalance is quite controversial (see Bird 2003)

Vertical Fiscal Imbalance (VFI) is conceptually distinct from the notion of Vertical Fiscal Gap (VFG). These terms are used as synonyms, but they are not.

Following Sharma (2011), any existing revenue-expenditure asymmetry between the two levels of a government should simply be called a Vertical Fiscal Asymmetry (VFA). The precise nature of this asymmetry, in a particular country, can be determined by using certain criteria that the author has evolved. The kind of policy solution to be applied will depend on the nature of asymmetry (VFA). Thus, there can be three types of VFAs:

 Fiscal asymmetry with fiscal imbalance: VERTICAL FISCAL IMBALANCE (VFI). This means inappropriate allocation of revenue powers and spending responsibilities. This state can be remedied by reassignment of revenue raising powers.
 Fiscal asymmetry without fiscal imbalance but with a fiscal gap: VERTICAL FISCAL GAP (VFG). This means a desirable revenue-expenditure asymmetry but with a fiscal gap to be closed. This state can be remedied by re-calibration of federal transfers.
 Fiscal asymmetry without fiscal imbalance and without fiscal gap: VERTICAL FISCAL DIFFERENCE (VFD). This means a desirable revenue-expenditure asymmetry without a fiscal gap ( i.e. gap is closed). This is a state of fiscal asymmetry where there is "no imbalance and no gap" and thus needs no remedial measure.

The VFI-VFG-VFD offers a nice framework to understand and debate issues surrounding fiscal federalism. VFD is a concept that has entered the lexicon of fiscal federalism and has the power to clarify the debate on intergovernmental financial relations.

Vertical Fiscal Gap as the revenue deficiency arising from a mismatching between revenue capacity and expenditure needs.

Local, national and international public goods 
Various activities of the government are undertaken at different levels. To understand the assignment of responsibilities to the different levels of state, it can be beneficial to define, whether it is more useful to deal with problems at the local or the federal level. Public goods in general are goods that are neither excludable nor rival. For that reason, they are usually provided by the government. For some kind of goods, the benefits accrue to residents of a particular area or community. These are called local public goods. Examples of them are traffic lights or fire protection. In contrast, for national public goods there is a presumption for federal provision, because their benefits accrue to everyone in the nation. An example is national defense. There are also some public goods, from which benefit people living all over the world. These are called international public goods, e.g. global environment.

To be the supply of public goods efficient, national public goods must be supplied at national level, local public goods at local level, etc. If the provision of national public goods is left to local communities, there would be a freerider problem and there can occur an undersupply of those goods. Similarly, there is likely to be an undersupply of international public goods, if they are provided by the national governments. However, it does not exist any highest level of the government, which stands above national governments, which would be given responsibility for resolving global externality problems. The closest approximation to a global government is probably the United Nations General Assembly.

On the other hand, it is beneficial, when local public goods are provided by local governments and not national. Charles Tiebout of the University of Washington argued that competition among communities ensures efficiency in the supply of local public goods, like it does a competition among private subjects in the supply of private goods. Competition between communities arises naturally, because if the citizens of the community do not like, how the public goods are provided to them, they can move to the other community, where they think the provision of public goods is better. Moving from one town to another is naturally much easier than moving to a different country. This argument is called Tiebout hypothesis.

The provision of local public goods by local governments is not always optimal and sometimes federal intervention may be required. The question of which activities should take place at which level of government is called optimal fiscal federalism. Reasons, why federal government might intervenes to the provision of public local goods include market failures and redistribution. Market failures occur because actions of one community have effects on the others (externalities) and similarly as in the market with private goods, competition is not perfect, because there is always a limited number of communities. The problem of redistribution is that with free migration and local competition communities will not redistribute income (to individuals or between communities) or, at most, the redistribution will be limited. From this reason, redistribution is performed by the higher levels of government.

Grants  
Federal government redistributes the income to lower levels of government using tools that are called grants. It does so because of several reasons. Local governments have often better information about preferences of local people and costs. Another reason is that the federal government may try to offer states and localities incentives to undertake additional spending, from which will benefit also neighboring communities or the whole country.

The composition of federal grants in the US has changed significantly over the past 50 years. Nowadays, federal grants for health programs represent 65 percent of the total amount of money distributed by federal grants, compared with less than 20 percent in 1980.

There are two main types of federal grants. A matching grant is a grant, which ties the amount of funds provided by the higher level of government to the local community to the amount of spending by the local community. The local state determines the level of expenditure and federal government pays a certain part of the amount. For example, one-for-one matching grant for some specific purpose would provide 1$ of funding from a higher level for each 1$ paid by lower level. In comparison, when the government provides a block grant, the amount of money paid by government is given and every cost above this number is paid by the local level government. Block grants can be also provided being tied up to any specific use. A grant of some fixed amount with a mandate that money be spent only on some specific purpose is called conditional block grant. In general, grants that are restricted to a particular way of use are called categorical grants.

Matching grants are more effective in encouraging expenditures for specific purpose. They effectively lower the price of certain local public goods. This change pivots the budget constraint outwards. As a result of both income and substitution effect spending on those goods increases. Matching grants have distortionary effect, which means that same utility level as provide these grants can be attained at lower cost with block grants. When a community is offered an unconditional block grant, a lump-sum transfer shifts the budget constraint outwards. Conditional block grants have effects much like a lump sum grant - it makes no difference whether it is given, what should the additional money be used for, so long as the amount of money provided is less than the total desired expenditure. This means that the effect of a conditional block grant will be different from that of an unconditional block grant only if the funded local community would have spent less than the amount of grant without the mandate on how it is to be spent. However, this theory, which says that it does not matter, whether there is a condition or not, might not always be true. Some empirical evidence indicates the presence of a so called "flypaper effect", which says that the grant leads to significantly greater spending on the desired local public goods.

Fiscal Federalism Network
The relationship between central and subcentral government bodies has a profound effect on efficiency and equity within the government and on macroeconomic stability of the country. The role of the OECD Network on Fiscal Relations Across Levels of Government, part of its Centre for Tax Policy and Administration, is to provide data and analysis on these relationships between organizations at different levels of government.

See also
 Fiscal imbalance
 Fiscal union
 Full fiscal autonomy for Scotland

References

Bibliography 
 Ferrara, A.  (2010) Cost-Benefit Analysis of Multi-Level Government: The Case of EU Cohesion Policy and US Federal Investment Policies, London and New York: Routledge.
 Groenendijk, Nico. 2002. 'Fiscal federalism Revisited' paper presented at Institutions in Transition Conference organized by IMAD, Slovenia Ljublijana.
 King, David. 1984. Fiscal Tiers: The Economics of Multilevel Government, London: George Allen and Unwin.
 Oates, W.E. 1999. 'An Essay on Fiscal federalism', Journal of economic Literature, 37(3):1120-49 JSTOR.
 Sharma, Chanchal kumar.2005a 'When Does decentralization deliver? The Dilemma of Design', South Asian Journal of Socio-Political Studies6(1):38-45.
 Sharma, Chanchal Kumar.2005b. 'The Federal Approach to Fiscal Decentralization: Conceptual Contours for Policy Makers', Loyola Journal of Social Sciences, XIX(2):169-88 (Listed :International Bibliography of Social Sciences, London School of Economics and Political Science)
 Sharma, Chanchal Kumar and A. Valdesalici 2020 ‘FISCAL FEDERALISM’ in Grote, R, Lachenmann, F, and Wolfrum, R, (eds),  Max Planck Encyclopaedia of Comparative Constitutional Law (OXFORD UNIVERSITY PRESS), available at www.mpeccol.com.
 Bahl, R., & Bird, R. 2008. Subnational taxes in developing countries: The way forward. Public Budgeting & Finance, 28(4), 1-25.
Faguet, J.P. and C. Poschl 2015. Is Decentralization Good for Development? Perspectives from Academics and Policymakers. Oxford: Oxford University Press.
 Stiglitz, Joseph E. (1999). Economics of the public sector. New York, London: W.W. Norton & Company. pp. 733–734. . 
 Hillman, Arye L. (2009). Public Finance and Public Policy. (Second edition ed.). New York: Cambridge University Press. p. 728. .
 Gruber, Jonathan (2012). Public Finance and Public Policy.(fourth edition ed.). New York: Worth Publishers. p. 269-271. ISBN 
Kadochnikov, Denis V.  (2019) Fiscal decentralization and regional budgets’ changing roles: a comparative case study of Russia and China, Area Development and Policy, DOI: 10.1080/23792949.2019.1705171

 
Decentralization